Michael Andrew Varley (30 November 1939 – 8 September 2018) was a British boxer. He competed in the men's welterweight event at the 1964 Summer Olympics.

Varley won the 1964 Amateur Boxing Association British welterweight title, when boxing out of the Clifton ABC.

References

1939 births
2018 deaths
British male boxers
Olympic boxers of Great Britain
Boxers at the 1964 Summer Olympics
Boxers from Nottingham
Welterweight boxers